Kent was a parliamentary constituency covering the county of Kent in southeast England. It returned two "knights of the shire" (Members of Parliament) to the House of Commons by the bloc vote system from the year 1290. Members were returned to the Parliament of England until the Union with Scotland created the Parliament of Great Britain in 1708, and to the Parliament of the United Kingdom after the union with Ireland in 1801 until the county was divided by the Reform Act 1832.

History

Boundaries
The constituency consisted of the historic county of Kent. (Although Kent contained eight boroughs, each of which elected two MPs in its own right for part of the period when Kent was a constituency, these were not excluded from the county constituency, and the ownership of property within the borough could confer a vote at the county election. This was even the case for the city of Canterbury, which had the status of a county in itself: unlike those in almost all other counties of cities, Canterbury's freeholders were entitled to vote for Kent's MPs.)

The constituency boundaries may have theoretically encompassed a much larger area and population than would at first appear. After the American Revolution, it was apparently solemnly argued in Parliament that the rebels' complaint of no taxation without representation was mistaken, since "all the grants of land in America were to be held of the Manor of Greenwich in the County of Kent, and therefore the Knights of the Shire for the County of Kent represented all Americans". However, this somewhat flimsy argument - relying on an obsolete legal fiction dating back to the land ownership laws of the feudal system - seems not to have been received entirely respectfully even in the 18th century, and it is certainly not recorded that Kent's returning officer was ever bothered by American colonists demanding their right to vote.

Franchise
In medieval times, the custom in Kent, as elsewhere, was for the MPs for the county and those for its boroughs to be elected on the same day at the county court, by the suitors to the court, which meant the tiny handful of the local nobility who were tenants in chief of the Crown. Thus we find it recorded that in the second year of the reign of Henry V, "In the County Court of Kent, held at Rochester, Four Coroners and Eight others present, chose the Knights for the County, and the same person elect two Citizens for Canterbury, and two for Rochester."

From 1430, the Forty Shilling Freeholder Act extended the right to vote to every man who possessed freehold property within the county valued at £2 or more per year for the purposes of land tax; it was not necessary for the freeholder to occupy his land, nor even in later years to be resident in the county at all.

Except during the period of the Commonwealth in the mid 17th century, Kent had two MPs elected by the bloc vote method, under which each voter had two votes. In the nominated Barebones Parliament, five members represented Kent. In the First and Second Parliaments of Oliver Cromwell's Protectorate, however, there was a general redistribution of seats and Kent elected 11 members, though most of the county's boroughs lost one or both of their MPs. The traditional arrangements were restored from 1659.

Political character
At the time of the Great Reform Act in 1832, Kent had a population of approximately 480,000, though only between 8,000 and 9,000 of these were qualified to vote at the start of the 19th century, and fewer than 4,000 actually voted at the last contested election, in 1818. It has been estimated that in this period around a third of Kent's voters were urban, spread among a couple of dozen medium-sized and small towns: Canterbury, Maidstone, Dover, Deal, Chatham and the growing resorts of Ramsgate and Margate were the biggest, but at the election of 1802 the pollbooks show that only Canterbury (with 384 voters) contributed more than 250 to the poll.

With the villages outvoting the towns by two to one, no particular local interest predominated. By custom, the choice was generally one member from East Kent and one from West Kent. The county's MPs were generally drawn from the leading local families of gentry, but rarely from the nobility, and the voters jealously guarded their independence: although important peers wielded significant influence at times - the Earl of Westmorland and Earl of Winchelsea at the turn of the 18th century for example, the Duke of Dorset sixty years later - it always fell far short of control over the outcome.

Elections were held at a single polling place, and voters from the rest of the county had to travel to the county town to exercise their franchise. It was normal for voters to expect the candidates for whom they voted to meet their expenses in travelling to the poll, making the cost of fighting an election substantial. Contested elections were therefore rare in most counties, but Kent was something of an exception: voters went to the polls at 14 of the 29 general elections between 1700 and 1832, a total exceeded only by Surrey among the other English counties.

Those elections which were contested seem rarely to have been decided on party lines, and too great an adherence to party loyalty by the MPs was sometimes resented. The voters also expected the solicitous attention of their members. Jupp reprints the resolutions passed by a County meeting of Kent freeholders in 1820:
1. That it is essential to the honour and credit of this County, that it should be represented by two gentlemen constantly resident therein.2. That it is the opinion of this Meeting that this county was in the last Parliament very inefficiently represented by one of its members, inasmuch as his residence was elsewhere, and the Freeholders were thereby deprived of that easy access and free communication which are essential between the constituent and the representative.3. That it is the opinion of this meeting that the conduct of a County member in Parliament should be at all times marked by independence, equally free from subserviency to any Administration and unshackled by any Party indiscriminately hostile thereto.4. That we cannot recognise in Mr Honywood's uniform opposition to every measure recently proposed in Parliament, for the purpose of restraining the career of sedition, blasphemy and crime, the influence of that elevated spirit, which should direct the actions of an independent representative for this great and enlightened County.
These sentiments were clearly not held universally, however, since the apostrophised Mr Honywood was re-elected at that year's election.

Abolition
The constituency was abolished in 1832 by the Great Reform Act, being divided into two two-member county divisions, Eastern Kent and Western Kent.

Members of Parliament

MPs 1290–1660

 Constituency created (1290)

MPs 1640–1832

Notes

Election results

References
Robert Beatson, A Chronological Register of Both Houses of Parliament (London: Longman, Hurst, Res & Orme, 1807) 
D Brunton & D H Pennington, Members of the Long Parliament (London: George Allen & Unwin, 1954)
 John Cannon, Parliamentary Reform 1640-1832 (Cambridge: Cambridge University Press, 1972)
Cobbett's Parliamentary history of England, from the Norman Conquest in 1066 to the year 1803 (London: Thomas Hansard, 1808) 
 Maija Jansson (ed.), Proceedings in Parliament, 1614 (House of Commons) (Philadelphia: American Philosophical Society, 1988) 
 Peter Jupp, British and Irish Elections 1784-1831 (Newton Abbott: David & Charles, 1973)
 F D MacKinnon, On Circuit (Cambridge: Cambridge University Press, 1940), quoted in Michael Gilbert (ed.), The Oxford Book of Legal Anecdotes (Oxford: Oxford University Press, 1989)
 Lewis Namier & John Brooke, The History of Parliament: The House of Commons 1754-1790 (London: HMSO, 1964)
 J E Neale, The Elizabethan House of Commons (London: Jonathan Cape, 1949) 
 Charles Henry Parry (ed), The Parliaments and Councils of England (London: John Murray, 1839)
 J Holladay Philbin, Parliamentary Representation 1832 - England and Wales (New Haven: Yale University Press, 1965)
 Robert Walcott, English Politics in the Early Eighteenth Century (Oxford: Oxford University Press, 1956)
 Dictionary of National Biography

Parliamentary constituencies in Kent (historic)
Constituencies of the Parliament of the United Kingdom established in 1290
Constituencies of the Parliament of the United Kingdom disestablished in 1832